William Calhoun (born July 22, 1964) is an American drummer who is a member of the rock band Living Colour.

Career
Calhoun was born in the Bronx, New York. He moved to Boston to attend the Berklee College of Music, where he graduated with a music production and engineering degree. He received the Buddy Rich Jazz Masters award for outstanding performance as a drummer.

Though best known as the drummer of the rock band Living Colour, Calhoun has also played with Jungle Funk and HeadFake, recorded jazz albums as a leader, and appeared with Pharoah Sanders, B.B. King, Herb Alpert, Dr. John, Jaco Pastorius, Wayne Shorter, Marcus Miller, Public Enemy, and Ronnie Wood. He plays on "Crimson Deep" from the album What Lies Beneath by Finnish symphonic metal singer Tarja. He is also a member of the Stone Raiders musical band.

He was voted "Best new drummer of 1988" by Modern Drummer magazine's readers' poll, then again as "Number one progressive drummer" three times (1989, 1991 & 1992). He was named "Best Drummer of 1990" by Rolling Stone magazine's critics poll. He has won two Grammy Awards, one in 1989 for Best Hard Rock Performance by a Group while in Living Colour, then again for Best Hard Rock Performance with the band in 1990. Living Colour also won an international rock award in 1991 for Best Rock Band. In addition to drumming, Calhoun also wrote the songs "Pride," featured on Time's Up, and "Nothingness" from Stain.

Calhoun's drumming incorporates different stylistic influences and augmenting technologies. With Living Colour, he was one of the first drummers to blend advanced funk and fusion techniques with elements of hard rock and thrash metal. More recently, he has integrated drum and bass grooves, ethnic percussion, and sampling into his playing. He is a very physical player with a broad vocabulary from exact grooves to more free-form avant-funk and jazz approaches. He is also an avid user of the Korg Wavedrum, which allows him to integrate effects (including guitar pedals and other effects not typically associated with percussion instruments) into a single drum. Calhoun added a Mandala Drum into his setup. The Mandala is a dynamic multiple control zone electronic surface that uses sensor technology to detect where and how hard a surface strike occurs.

Discography

With Living Colour

Solo
 1995 Housework
 1997 Drumwave
 2000 Live at the Blue Note
 2005 Native Lands
 2013 Life in this World
 2016 Celebrating Elvin Jones

As sideman
With Santi Debriano
Artistic License (Savant, 2001)
With Wayne Shorter
High Life (Verve, 1995)
With various
People Get Ready – A Tribute to Curtis Mayfield (1993)

References

External links
 
 Head>>Fake extended Interview with Doug Wimbish and Will Calhoun for radio orange94.0 stream (October 2008)
 Drummerworld.com
 Will Calhoun video interview at allaboutjazz.com

1964 births
Living people
African-American drummers
Berklee College of Music alumni
African-American rock musicians
American heavy metal drummers
Alternative metal musicians
Living Colour members
Jazz fusion drummers
20th-century American drummers
American male drummers
20th-century American male musicians
American male jazz musicians
Motéma Music artists
20th-century African-American musicians
21st-century African-American people